Peter John Lockwood is a seasoned ICT professional and former Australian politician. He was an Australian Labor Party member of the Victorian Legislative Assembly, from 2002 to 2006.

He started working life in the Commonwealth Bank, but gave that up to work on the government buses in Sydney. After completing a computer course, he worked as a computer operator at DHA (Drug Houses of Australia), then moved to other employers in Sydney before moving to Canberra to join the Australian Public Service during the period of the Whitlam Government, where he was part of the last Programmer in Training (PIT) intake in the public service, where tertiary study at the Canberra College of Advanced Education (now the University of Canberra) and on-the-job training in automatic data processing (ADP) were combined.

After 9 years in Canberra, he moved to Melbourne, where Lockwood joined Myer. Following a period at Myer, Peter became a business proprietor during 1985–1991. He went on to work for PAXUS, Telstra and IBM.

He earned a Bachelor of Arts from Swinburne University in 1987, and served on Knox City Council from 1993–94, 2000–2003 and 2012-2020. From 1989–2002, he was a secretary of the Knoxfield branch of the Labor Party and secretary and state delegate of the Aston FEA (Federal Electorate Assembly) for the ALP 1991-2002. Peter stood as a Labor candidate for Wantirna in 1992, a disastrous election for Labor.

He unsuccessfully contested the federal seat of Aston for the Australian Labor Party in the 1998 federal election, but was the successful candidate for Bayswater in the Victorian Legislative Assembly in the 2002 state election. He was a backbencher in the Bracks Government until 2006, when he lost his seat to the Liberal Party. Since then he again sought election as a Councillor for the City of Knox at the Local Government Elections in 2012 and has served as a Councillor since then representing Baird Ward. Peter was re-elected to council in 2016.  He served as a member of the board of the Municipal Association of Victoria (MAV) in 2013–15, and a member of the board of Eastern Regional Libraries during 2012–16 and 2017–18. He was the Mayor for 2014–15.

Personal life 
Peter was born in Sydney, New South Wales, to Jack and Norma Lockwood, and attended Drummoyne Boys' High School. He married his wife Marie in Sydney and has 2 children.

References

 

1950 births
Living people
Australian Labor Party members of the Parliament of Victoria
Members of the Victorian Legislative Assembly
21st-century Australian politicians
Swinburne University of Technology alumni
Politicians from Sydney
University of Canberra alumni